Nestoras Mytidis (born 1 June 1991) is a Cypriot professional footballer who plays as a striker for Greek Super League 2 club Panachaiki.

Club career
Mytidis began playing football at a young age and after the arrival of Andreas Michaelides, he progressed to the first team, that was playing at Cyprus Second Division during the 2009–10 season, and had two appearances, helping the team promote back to First Division.

In the 2010–11 season, Ton Caanen established Mitidis as a regular first team player, and on 13 November 2010, he scored his first senior goal of his career, in the 85th minute of a win against Ermis Aradippou.

He scored his first goal for the Europa League in an 8–0 victory for AEK Larnaca against Floriana in Hibernians Ground.

On 12 July 2016, Mytidis signed a two-year contract with option for another one with the Dutch club, Roda JC Kerkrade.

In April 2017, Mytidis permanently returned to AEK Larnaca following a six-month loan.

On 18 December 2017, Mytidis signed a six months contract with Super League club Kerkyra on loan from AEK Larnaca.

International career
Mytidis outstanding performances caught the eye of Angelos Anastasiadis who called him to the Cyprus national football team when he was only 19 years old. On 16 November 2010, he debuted for Cyprus, playing in a friendly match against Jordan as substitution on 64th minute.

Honours
Levadiakos
Super League 2: 2021–22

References

External links
AEK.com.cy profile

1991 births
Living people
Association football forwards
Cypriot footballers
Cyprus international footballers
Cypriot First Division players
Super League Greece players
Super League Greece 2 players
Eredivisie players
AEK Larnaca FC players
AEL Limassol players
Roda JC Kerkrade players
PAE Kerkyra players
Panachaiki F.C. players
Levadiakos F.C. players
Expatriate footballers in the Netherlands
Expatriate footballers in Greece
Cypriot expatriate footballers
People from Larnaca